If Loving You Is Wrong is an American primetime television soap opera, created, executive produced, written and directed by Tyler Perry. The show premiered September 9, 2014, on the Oprah Winfrey Network. If Loving You Is Wrong is loosely based on Perry's 2014 film,  The Single Moms Club.

Series overview

Episodes

Season 1 (2014–16)

Season 2 (2016–17)

Season 3 (2017–18)

Season 4 (2019)

Season 5 (2020)

Ratings

References

External links
 Episodes of If Loving You Is Wrong on TV Guide

Lists of American drama television series episodes
Lists of soap opera episodes